Code page 1023 (CCSID 1023), also known as CP1023 or E7DEC, is an IBM code page number assigned to the Spanish variant of DEC's National Replacement Character Set (NRCS). The 7-bit character set was introduced for DEC's computer terminal systems, starting with the VT200 series in 1983, but is also used by IBM for their DEC emulation. Similar but not identical to the series of ISO 646 character sets, the character set is a close derivation from ASCII with only eight code points differing.

Code page layout

References

1023